Tevar is a 2015 Indian Hindi-language action film directed by debutante Amit Ravindernath Sharma and produced by Boney Kapoor, Sanjay Kapoor, Sunil Lulla, Naresh Agarwal and Sunil Manchanda, based on a script by Sharma and Shantanu Shrivastav. An official remake of the 2003 Telugu film Okkadu, the film stars Arjun Kapoor and Sonakshi Sinha while Manoj Bajpayee plays the primary antagonist. Shruti Haasan makes a special appearance in a special dance number, while crooning another song on the soundtrack. The film was released worldwide on 9 January 2015.

Plot

Ghanshyam "Pintoo" Shukla is a young Kabaddi player from Agra who goes to factionism-hit Mathura to take part in practice. There, in a twist of fate, he saves a civilian, Radhika Mishra from a goon, Gajendar Singh, a dangerous faction leader, who is in love with Radhika and wants to marry her against her wishes. Pintoo tries to comfort her because Gajendar Singh killed her brother Mahesh. When he saves Radhika, he humiliates Gajendar into taking his pants off. Gajendar refuses to put them back on until someone finds Radhika and brings her back. Pintoo helps Radhika escape and takes her to his house in Agra, hiding her in his room with the help of his sister, Pinky.

Soon, his parents find out she is hiding in their house. Radhika and Pintoo run away again and she falls in love with him. The next day, after taking care of Gajendar and his men, Pintoo and his friends drop Radhika off at the airport to go to America. Radhika cries on the way there, not wanting to leave Pintoo. They bring her parents to see her one last time before she leaves. After Radhika is past airport security, Pintoo realizes he loves Radhika. She shows up behind him, saying that she was waiting for him to stop her. She turns to leave when Pintoo is silent, taking it as a refusal, but Pintoo calls her back, and they confirm their love with a hug.

Pintoo's police chief father, SP Ravikant Shukla and Gajendar show up at the airport, and Ravikant arrests him while Gajendar takes Radhika away. While under Gajendar's jurisdiction, Radhika taunts him and claims that Pintoo will definitely return for her. Gajendar goes to the jail and asks Pintoo to come with him. Here, Pintoo and Ravikant solve their relationship, when Ravikant expresses that he's not worried Pintoo will come home hurt; rather, he's worried for Gajendar.

Gajendar and his men get Pintoo injured in front of the whole town. Home Minister Mahender Singh, who is the reason Gajendar has not gotten in trouble all this time, tells him to stop making a scene, as he's ruining his political party, but Gajendar slaps Mahender and goes on to fight Pintoo. He is further enraged when he sees how much Radhika loves Pintoo, and stabs him with a knife. Pintoo falls to the ground. Radhika tries to run to him, crying his name, but Gajendar drags her away. Pintoo is able to get up again, picking up the scarf that Radhika dropped. He ties it around his waist where the knife wound is, and fights and defeats Gajender's men. He also defeats Gajender until Gajendar gets back up with a gun. However, he is shot down by Kakdi, his own right-hand man on the instructions of Mahender who has had enough of Gajender's antics and insubordination and it is implied that Kakdi has now been appointed as Gajender's replacement. With Gajender dead, his goons have no interest in Pintoo and Radhika who are now reunited.

Cast
Arjun Kapoor as Ghanshyam "Pintoo" Shukla
Sonakshi Sinha as Radhika Mishra
Manoj Bajpayee as Gajendar Singh
Gunjan Malhotra as Pinky
Rajesh Sharma as Home Minister Mahender Singh
Subrat Dutta as Kakdi
Raj Babbar as SP Ravikant Shukla
Deepti Naval as Pintoo's Mother
Mahendra Mewati as Mahesh Kumar Mishra, Radhika's brother
Bhuvan Arora as Ghonsla, Pintoo's friend
Tushar Pandey as Bhatura, Pintoo's Friend
V K Sharma as Radhika's Father
Bhagwan Tiwari as Jagdish Chaudhary
Shruti Haasan in a special appearance in the song "Madmiyan"

Production 
In November 2013, it was reported that Arjun Kapoor and Sonakshi Sinha had joined an upcoming untitled film that was being produced by Boney Kapoor. On 10 December 2013, the film was titled Tevar and it was revealed that Kapoor will play the role of a college student from Agra, who is a Kabaddi champion. On 17 December 2013 it was announced that Sanjay Kapoor will be producing the film, and that Amit Sharma will be making his directorial debut. Manoj Bajpayee also joined the film on 30 December.

Filming 
The shooting of the film began on 21 January 2014 at Sambhar Lake in Jaipur, Rajasthan. The film's shooting continued in different locations including Mumbai, Maheshwar, Agra, Mathura, Pandharpur at river side of Chandrabhaga and also in Haridas ves in Pandharpur (solapur, Maharashtra) Akluj (Solapur, Maharashtra) (khargone, Madhya Pradesh).

Soundtrack

The soundtrack was composed by duo Sajid–Wajid. Pakistani-Dutch singer Imran Khan made his Bollywood debut with this film. The lyrics were written by Kausar Munir, Danish Sabri, Sajid and Imran Khan. Prior to the soundtrack's full release, "Superman" was released as the lead single, followed by "Let's Celebrate"..

Track listing

Critical reception 

Tevar was rated low by most critics. Raja Sen of Rediff rated the film 1 and wrote, "And since one can’t, in all good conscience, let anyone stray into Gangs Of Jockeypur, consider yourselves warned. Stay away" Saurabh Dwivedi of India Today said, "The film becomes a watch because of its power packed dialogues written by Shantanu Shrivastava."

References

External links 
 

2015 directorial debut films
Indian action films
2015 action films
Hindi remakes of Telugu films
Films shot in Rajasthan
Films shot in Mumbai
Films shot in Uttar Pradesh
Films scored by Sajid–Wajid
2015 films
2010s Hindi-language films
2015 masala films
Hindi-language action films
Films directed by Amit Sharma (director)
Kabaddi in India